Sarcophaga  vagans is a species of fly in the family Sarcophagidae. It is found in the  Palearctic .

References

External links
Images representing Sarcophaga at BOLD

Sarcophagidae
Insects described in 1826
Muscomorph flies of Europe